Zheng Shusen (born January 9, 1950) is a Chinese engineer and surgeon. He is a liver transplant expert who is a professor and doctoral supervisor at Zhejiang University. He is an academician of the Chinese Academy of Engineering and foreign academician of the Académie Nationale de Médecine. He is internationally known for his studies on organ transplantation and hepato-pancreato-biliary surgery.

Biography
Zheng was born in Longyou County, Zhejiang, on January 9, 1950. After the high school, he studied, then taught, at what is now Zhejiang University School of Medicine. He earned his master's degree from the university in 1986.

Contributions
In October 1991, as the first assistant, Zheng Shusen participated in the first human orthotopic liver transplantation in the Queen Mary Hospital of Hong Kong University, which became one of the top ten news in Hong Kong that year. In June 2001, Zheng Shusen performed the first living donor liver transplantation for children, creating the youngest living donor record in China at that time. He has completed 2800 cases of liver transplantation in China.

Honours and awards
 November 2001 Member of the Chinese Academy of Engineering (CAE)
 2012 Honorary academician of Surgery of Hong Kong 
 2013 Science and Technology Progress Award of the Ho Leung Ho Lee Foundation
 2015 State Science and Technology Progress Award (Second Class)
 December 19, 2017 Foreign member of the Académie Nationale de Médecine
 2021 Fellow of the American Institute for Medical and Biological Engineering

Personal life
Zheng married Li Lanjuan, who is a hepatologist, epidemiologist, and an academician of the Chinese Academy of Engineering. The couple have a son named Zheng Jie.

References

External links
Zheng Shusen on Zhejiang University

1950 births
Living people
Chinese surgeons
Engineers from Zhejiang
Members of the Chinese Academy of Engineering
People from Longyou County
Physicians from Zhejiang
Zhejiang University alumni
Academic staff of Zhejiang University